Rock Health is a full-service seed fund that supports startups working in digital health, also called health technology. Rock Health offers funding, access to medical, venture, legal and corporate partners, and office space to its portfolio companies.

History 

Rock Health was founded in 2010 by Harvard Business School classmates Halle Tecco and Nate Gross. Rock Health's inaugural portfolio class began in June 2011. Gross went on to co-found Doximity with Jeff Tangney, previously co-founder of Epocrates. In October 2016, Rock Health named pharma veteran Bill Evans as managing director.

Partners 
Rock Health partners include Fenwick & West, GE, Genentech, Harvard Medical School, Kaiser Permanente, Kleiner Perkins Caufield & Byers, Mayo Clinic, Mohr Davidow Ventures, Montreux Equity Partners, Qualcomm Life, UnitedHealth Group, and UCSF.

References 

Medical and health organizations based in California